is a 1997 Japanese kaiju film directed by Kunio Miyoshi, written by Masumi Suetani, and produced by Hiroaki Kitayama and Shōgo Tomiyama. Produced and distributed by Toho Studios, the film features the fictional monster character Mothra, and is the second film in the Rebirth of Mothra trilogy, following the previous year's Rebirth of Mothra.

Rebirth of Mothra II stars Sayaka Yamaguchi, Megumi Kobayashi, Aki Hano, and Hikari Mitsushima, and was the final tokusatsu film to feature special effects directed by Koichi Kawakita. The film was released in Japan on December 13, 1997, and was followed by Rebirth of Mothra III the following year.

Plot
Off the coast of Japan, the environment has been ravaged by poisonous starfish-like creatures called Barem. Meanwhile, the Elias sisters, Moll and Lora, survey the destruction and enlist the help of three children, who had discovered and befriended a strange little creature dubbed "Ghogo" to help find the mysterious treasure of Nirai Kanai, an ancient lost civilization, to save the Earth from the declining environment.

Along the way, the Elias tell the children the source of the Barem is a monster called Dagahra, which Nirai Kanai created to manage pollution, but went wrong. Their ally Mothra Leo, can defeat it, but will need to reach Nirai Kanai's lost castle and find the civilization's treasure first. Meanwhile, the Elias' vengeful sister, Belvera, manipulates two fishermen to help her get the treasure before her sisters. Both parties journey to the castle, which rises from underneath the ocean upon their arrival.

Awakened by an increase in pollution levels, Dagahra releases a swarm of Barem into the sea, killing numerous forms of sea life. Moll and Lora call Leo, who nearly succeeds in defeating Dagahra until the sea monster takes the battle underwater and incapacitates him with Barem. Leo lands on the newly raised Nirai Kanai temple, but before Dagahra can kill him, the structure activates and defends Leo. With its opponent powerless, Dagahra goes on a rampage.

Inside the temple, Moll, Lora, and the children attempt to find the treasure while Belvera and her thralls try to thwart their mission. After stealing jewels they had found, the fishermen inadvertently unlock a gateway and awaken the Princess of Nirai Kanai, who tells the Elias sisters that Earth must be protected and saved, the children are the hope of future generations, and reveals Ghogo is the lost treasure.

Moll and Lora use Ghogo's energy to revive Leo and transform him into Rainbow Mothra, allowing him to destroy the Barem covering his body. Rainbow Mothra engages Dagahra and overpowers him until the latter retreats into the sea, where Rainbow Mothra transforms into Aqua Mothra. His new form allows him to defeat Dagahra by splitting into a swarm of miniature Aqua Mothras and enter the monster's body to destroy the Barem, causing Dagahra to self-destruct. As the temple begins to collapse, Moll and Lora fly to safety on their pet miniature Mothra, Fairy, while Belvera relinquishes control of the fishermen, who help the children escape. The Princess raises Dagahra's body and places it in the temple before lowering it back into the sea while Aqua Mothra reverts to Rainbow Mothra.

Cast
 Sayaka Yamaguchi as Lora
 Megumi Kobayashi as Moll
 Aki Hano as Belvera
 Hikari Mitsushima as Shiori Uchiura / Little Girl
 Masaki Otake as Kohei Toguchi
 Shimada Maganao as Yoji Miyagi
 Atsushi Okuno as Fisherman #1
 Hajime Okayama as Fisherman #2
 Nonami Maho as Yuna

Home media releases
Blu-ray Sony (Toho Godzilla Collection)

Aspect Ratio: 1.85:1 (1080p) [AVC]
Soundtrack(s): Japanese and English (DTS-HD 2.0 Stereo)
Subtitles: English, English SDH and French
Extras:
 Theatrical Trailer (1080i, 1:55)
 Teaser 1 (1080i, 0:31) 
 Teaser 2 (1080i, 0:39) 
 Teaser 3 (1080i, 1:05) 
Notes: Comes with Rebirth of Mothra and Rebirth of Mothra III. This film shares a disc with the third film, while the first has its own.

Sony Pictures - DVD
 Released: February 1, 2000

References

External links

1997 films
1997 fantasy films
1990s monster movies
Films set in 1998
Films set in Okinawa Prefecture
Giant monster films
1990s Japanese-language films
Japanese sequel films
Kaiju films
Films about dragons
Mothra
TriStar Pictures films
Films scored by Toshiyuki Watanabe
Films about princesses
1990s Japanese films